A conditional dismissal is a dismissal in United States law subject to conditions—for example, the dismissal of a suit for foreclosure of a mortgage, subject to receipt of payment in the amount of a tender which induced the dismissal.  Thompson v Crains, 294 Ill 270, 128 NE 508, 12 ALR 931.

References

Labour law